Yahyaabad (also Romanized as Yaḩyáābād) is a village in Fazl Rural District, in the Central District of Nishapur County, Razavi Khorasan Province, Iran. At the 2006 census, its population was 320, in 91 families.

References 

Populated places in Nishapur County